Viola Lynn Collins (born May 16, 1977) is an American actress. She has made television appearances in True Blood (2008), Manhunt: Unabomber (2017) and The Walking Dead (2021–2022), and is recognized for her roles in films such as X-Men Origins: Wolverine (2009) and John Carter (2012).

Youth and education
Viola Lynn Collins was born in College Station, Texas, reported variously in May or June 1977. Collins is said to have come from Houston, Texas. She has English, Scottish and Irish ancestry but has also made unsubstantiated claims of Cherokee ancestry. She spent her formative years in Singapore, with "summers in Japan where my parents were getting their fourth and fifth and sixth Dan (sic) in Shitaru ... Okinawa style karate". During a childhood Christmas pageant in which she played Mrs. Claus, Collins discovered her love for acting.

She attended Singapore American School and Klein High School in Texas. She graduated from the Juilliard School's Drama Division (Group 28: 1995–1999) with a Bachelor of Fine Arts degree.

Career
Collins made her television debut in 1999, in an episode of Law & Order: Special Victims Unit, and went on to star onstage as Ophelia opposite Liev Schreiber in Hamlet, followed by a turn as Juliet in Romeo and Juliet. After bit parts that included a stint on the show Haunted and roles in the  movies Down with Love, 50 First Dates and 13 Going on 30, she gained notice in the film The Merchant of Venice as the female lead Portia, alongside Al Pacino, Joseph Fiennes and Jeremy Irons, Collins' audition tape for the supporting role of Jessica having so impressed director Michael Radford that—upon Cate Blanchett's opting out as Portia (due to pregnancy)—Radford had championed Collins becoming Blanchett's replacement.

She furthered her profile in 2008 when she was cast as Jason Stackhouse's girlfriend Dawn Green in the first season of the HBO vampire series True Blood, and through a featured role as the hero's love interest Kayla Silverfox in the 2009 X-Men Origins: Wolverine opposite Hugh Jackman. Her first leading film role came in 2012 when she was cast as the headstrong Martian princess Dejah Thoris in John Carter.

Personal life
Collins married then 21-year-old actor Steven Strait on December 23, 2007, after a four-year relationship. Collins and Strait separated in 2013.

She married Matthew Boyle in November 2014. They divorced in 2016. They have a son.

In 2009, she posed nude for the May issue of Allure magazine.

Collins was raised in a "very, very religious" family of Southern Baptists, and has since explored several religious faiths, describing herself as a "pretty spiritual person."

Filmography

Film

Television

Awards and nominations

References

External links 

 

Living people
1977 births
20th-century American actresses
21st-century American actresses
Actresses from Houston
American expatriates in Japan
American expatriates in Singapore
American film actresses
American people of English descent
American people of Irish descent
American people of Scottish descent
American people who self-identify as being of Native American descent
American Shakespearean actresses
American stage actresses
American television actresses
Juilliard School alumni
Klein High School alumni